Pedro Sanz Alonso (born Igea, La Rioja, 27 December 1953), is a Spanish politician, President of the autonomous community of La Rioja from 1995 to 2015 and member of the centre-right People's Party.

He was a school teacher in the neighbouring Basque Country until 1981. In 1990 he became Secretary of the People's Party in La Rioja until 1993 when he was elected regional president of the party.

References

1953 births
Living people
Members of the 10th Senate of Spain
Members of the 11th Senate of Spain
Members of the 12th Senate of Spain
Members of the 13th Senate of Spain
People's Party (Spain) politicians
Presidents of La Rioja (Spain)
Politicians from La Rioja
Members of the 3rd Parliament of La Rioja (Spain)
Members of the 4th Parliament of La Rioja (Spain)
Members of the 5th Parliament of La Rioja (Spain)
Members of the 6th Parliament of La Rioja (Spain)
Members of the 7th Parliament of La Rioja (Spain)
Members of the 8th Parliament of La Rioja (Spain)
Members of the 9th Parliament of La Rioja (Spain)